Ralph Benatzky (5 June 1884 – 16 October 1957), born in Mährisch Budwitz (Moravské Budějovice) as Rudolph Franz [František] Josef Benatzky, was an Austrian composer of Moravian origin. He composed operas and operettas, such as Casanova (1928), Die drei Musketiere (1929), Im weißen Rössl (1930) and Meine Schwester und ich (1930). He died in Zürich, Switzerland.

Works 

 Laridon (1911)
 Cherchez la femme (1911)
 Der lachende Dreibund (1913)
 Anno 14 (1914)
 Prinzchens Frühlingserwachen (1914)
 Liebe im Schnee (1916)
 Die tanzende Maske (1918)
 Die Verliebten (1919)
 Apachen (1920)
 Ein Märchen aus Florenz (1923)
 Casanova, with music by Johann Strauss II (1928)
  (1929)
 Im weißen Rößl (1930)
 Meine Schwester und ich (1930)
 Zur goldenen Liebe (1931)
 Zirkus Aimée (1932)
 Büxl (1932)
 Bezauberndes Fräulein (1933)
 Reichste Mann der Welt (1935)
 Der König mit dem Regenschirm (1935)
  (1936)
 Majetät – Privat (1937)
 Herzen im Schnee (1937)
 Der Silberhof (1941)

Selected filmography 
 The Last Company (1930)
 The Immortal Vagabond (1930)
 Poor as a Church Mouse (1931)
 Chauffeur Antoinette (1932)
 To New Shores (1937)
 Such Great Foolishness (1937)
 Love Premiere (1943)
 Back Then (1943)
 White Horse Inn (1948)
 My Sister and I (1950)
 Fiancée for Hire (1950)
 Immortal Light (1951)
 The White Horse Inn (1952)
 The Charming Young Lady (1953)
 My Sister and I (1954)

Notes 
Benatzky is often mistakenly referred to as Jewish due to an error published in a book of Jewish musicians during World War II. Benatzky himself was not Jewish, but he was twice married to Jewish women: Josma Selim, a singer (Hedwig Josma Fischer; born 1884 in Wien; died 1929 in Berlin) and Melanie "Mela" Hoffmann, a dancer.

References

External links 
 
 

1884 births
1957 deaths
Austrian classical composers
Austrian male classical composers
Austrian opera composers
Male opera composers
20th-century classical composers
20th-century Austrian male musicians
Austrian exiles
Austrian refugees
Austrian expatriates in Switzerland
Austrian expatriates in the United States
Austrian people of Czech descent
People from Moravské Budějovice